WAIN-FM (93.5 MHz) is a radio station licensed to Columbia, Kentucky, United States.  The station is currently owned by Forcht Broadcasting.

References

External links

AIN-FM
Columbia, Kentucky